This list contains songs written by American country singer-songwriter Willie Nelson, including those where he is credited as co-author. The 337 songs are arranged alphabetically.



A 

A Moment Isn't Very Long
A Penny For Your Thoughts
Alice in Hulaland (co-written with Buddy Cannon)
Albania Albania 
Always Now
American Dream (co-written With Bob Dylan)
Amnesia
And So Will You My Love
Angel Flying Too Close To The Ground
Annie
Any Old Arms Won't Do (co-written With Hank Cochran)
Are You Ever Coming Home (co-written With Hank Cochran)
Are You Sure (co-written With Buddy Emmons)
Ashamed 
Au Jardin De Mes Reves (Albert Babin, rearranged)

B 
Bach Minuet In G (rearranged)
Back On The Road (co-written With Nathan Mackey)
Back to Earth
Baja Oklahoma (co-written With Dan Jenkins)
Band of Brothers
Bandera
Bird (co-written With Robert Braddock, Hal Coleman, Barry Etris, Claude Putman, Jr. And John Bush Shinn III)
Bird Medley
Blame It On The Times
Bloody Mary Morning
Blue Rock Montana
Both Ends Of The Candle
Broken Promise
Bring it On
Buddy

C 
Changing Skies
Christmas Blues (co-written With Booker Jones)
Christmas Prayer
Cling To The Spark
Cold Empty Spark
Come On Back Jesus
Congratulations
Country Willie
Crazy
Cry Softly Darling
Crying In The Heart

D 
Darkness On The Face Of The Earth
Darling Are You Ever Coming Home
December Day
Denver
Devil In A Sleeping Bag
Did I Ever Love You
Do Your Thing You're A Cowboy
Don't Say Love Or Nothing
Don't Touch Me There (co-written with Buddy Cannon)
Down At The Corner Beer Joint
Dream Come True
Driving the Herd (co-written with Buddy Cannon)

E 
Ehrbares Madchen
El Niño
Electric Horseman
Eleven Dixie Mudcats
End Of Understanding
Energy Follows Thought (co-written with Buddy Cannon)
Everybody's Baby
Everything But You
Everywhere I go

F 
Face of a Fighter
Family Bible
Follow Me Around
Following Me Around
Forgiving You Was Easy
Funny
Funny How Time Slips Away

G 
Ghost
Go Away
Goin' Home
Good Hearted Woman (co-written With Waylon Jennings)
Good Times
Guitar in the Corner
Great Divide

H 
Half a Man
Half Black Half Leopard
Happiness Lives Next Door
Hard Edge Texas (co-written With Kris Kristofferson)
He's Not For You
Healing Hands Of Time
Heartaches Of A Fool
Heartland
Heaven And Hell
Heebie Jeebie Blues No. 2
Hej Meddig
Hello Darling
Hello Fool
Hello Wall Number 2
Hello Walls
Hero
Hint Of Song
Hold Me Tighter
Home Is Where You're Happy
Home Motel
Homecoming In Heaven
Hot Blooded Woman
Hot Time In Music City Blues
How Does It Feel
How Long Is Forever

I 
I Am The Forest
I Can Cry Again
I Can Get Off On You
I Can Still Reach Yesterday
I Can't Find The Time
I Didn't Sleep A Wink
I Don't Feel Anything
I Don't Go To Funerals (co-written with Buddy Cannon)
I Don't Know Where I Am Today
I Don't Understand
I Feel Sorry For Him
I Gotta Get Drunk
I Guard The Canadian Border
I Guess I Ve Come To Live Here
I Just Can't Let You Say Goodbye
I Just Don't Understand
I Just Stopped By
I Let My Mind Wander
I Live One Day At A Time
I Never Cared For You
I Should Have Kissed Her More
I Still Can't Believe You're Gone
I Thought About You
I Thought I Left You
I Want A Girl
I Want To Be Alone
I Write You Letters
I'd Already Cheated On You
I'd Rather You Didn't Love Me
I'll Stay Around
I'm A Memory
I'm Building Heartaches
I'm Falling In Love Again
I'm Gonna Lose A Lot Of Teardrops
I'm Not Trying To Forget You
I'm So Ashamed
I'm Still Not Over You
I'm Waiting forever
I’ve Got A Wonderful Future
I’ve Just Destroyed The World
I’ve Loved You All Over The World
I’ve Seen All This World I Care to See
If You Could Only See
If You Really Loved Me
In God's Eyes
In The Car Again
Is The Better Part Over
Is There Something On Your Mind
Island In The Sea
It Could Be Said That Way
It Should Be Easier Now
It's A Dream Come True
It's Not For Me To Understand
It's Not Supposed To Be That Way
It's Only Money (co-written with Buddy Cannon)

J 
Jimmy's Road
Jingle Bells (James Pierpont, rearranged)
Just As I Am (Charlotte Elliott, William B. Bradbury)
Just For The Moment

K 
Kneel At The Feet Of Jesus

L 
Laying My Burdens Down
Laws of Nature
Lear And A Limo (co-written With Mickey Raphael)
Leave Alone
Let Me Be A Man
Let My Heart Be Broken
Let's Pretend We’re Strangers
Little Old Fashioned Karma
Little Things
Live Every Day (co-written with Buddy Cannon)
Local Memory
Loco
London
Lonely Little Mansion
Looking For A Place To Fall (co-written With Merle Haggard And Freddy Powers)

M 
Makin's Of A Song (co-written With Max Barnes, Waylon Jennings And Troy Seals)
Man With the Blues
Mariachi
Matador
Me And Paul
Mean Old Greyhound Bus
Message
Misery Mansion
More Than One Way To Cry
Mr. Record Man
My Heart Was A Dancer (co-written with Buddy Cannon)
My Kind Of Girl
My Love
My Love For The Rose
My Own Peculiar Way

N 
New Way To Cry
Night Life
No Love Around
No Place for Me
No Tomorrow In Sight
Nobody Said It Was Going To Be Easy
Nobody Slides My Friend

O 
O’er The Waves (Juventino Rosas, rearranged)
Old Age And Treachery
On the Road Again
On The Road Too Long
Once Along
One Day At A Time
One In A Row
One Step Beyond
Opportunity To Cry
Our Chain Of Love
Over You Again

P 
Pages
Part Where I Cry
The Party's Over
Permanently Lonely
Pet Wrangler
Phases, Stages, Circles, Cycles
Pick Up The Pieces
Pick Up The Tempo
Place To Fall Apart (co-written With Merle Haggard And Freddy Powers)
Precious Memories
Pretend I Never Happened
Pretty Paper
Pride Wins Again
Promises Promises
Pullamo

R 
Rainy Day Blues
Raysha's Theme
Remember The Good Times
Ridge Top
Right From Wrong
Road Happy (co-written With Dolly Parton)
Roll Me Up and Smoke Me When I Die
Run Jody Run

S 
Sad Songs And Waltzes
Save Your Tears
Send Me a Picture
Shall We Gather
She Always Comes Back To Me
She Is Gone
She Might Call
She's Gone (co-written With Fred Foster)
She's Not For You
She's Still Gone (Shirley Nelson)
Shelter Of My Arms
Shotgun Willie
Sister's Coming Home
Sit On My Lap
Sitting Here In Limbo (Written by Jimmy Cliff and Guilly Bright)
Slow Down Old World
So Much To Do
So You Think You're A Cowboy
Solidarity
Some Other Time
Somebody Pick Up My Pieces
Someone Waiting For You
Something To Think About
Sometimes She Lies (Harlan Howard, rearranged)
Somewhere In Texas
Songwriter
Sorrow Tearing Me Apart
Sound In Your Mind
Spirit I-iii
Spirit Of E Nine
Stage Coach Score (co-written With David Alan Coe)
Still Is Still Moving To Me
Storm Has Just Begun
Storm Within My Heart
Suffer In Silence
Summer Of Roses
Sweet Bye And Bye

T 
Take My Advice (co-written With David Alan Coe)
Take My Word
Talk To Me
Tell It To Jesus
Ten with a Two
Texas
That's What Children Are For
That's Why I Love Her
The Wall
There Are Worse Things Than Be
There Goes A Man
There Is A Fountain
There Is No Easy Way
There Shall Be Showers Of Blessings
There's A Way
There's Gonna Be Love In My Home
There's No Tomorrow In Sight
There's Worse Things Than Being Alone
These Are Difficult Times
They're All The Same
Things To Remember
Three Days
Time Of The Preacher
To Make A Long Story Short (She's Gone)
Today's Gonna Make A Wonderful
Too Sick To Pray
Too Young To Settle Down (co-written With Jack Rhodes)
Touch Me
Tougher Than Leather
Truth Will Set You Free
Turn Out The Lights (co-written By Hank Craig)
Twice The Man (co-written With Edwin Griens And Maribeth Murray)
Twinkle Twinkle Little Star
Two Different Roads (Hank Cochran, Jan Crutchfield; rearranged)
Two Sides To Every Story
Two Stories Wide

U 
Uncloudy Day ( THE UNCLOUDED DAY - Original Lyrics & Music: Josiah K. Alwood, circa 1880)
Undo The Right (co-written With Hank Cochran)
Used to Her

V
Valentine
Vir Ewig Is Ek Joune

W 
Waiting Forever For You
Waiting Time
Wake Me When It's Over
Walking
Wanted On Mother (co-written With Harlan Howard)
Wasted/Revenge
We Don't Run
We Look For Love
We Wouldn't Have It Any Other Way
What a Way to Live 
What Can You Do To Me Now (co-written With Hank Cochran)
What Do You Think Of Her Now (co-written With Hank Cochran)
What Do You Want Me To Do
What Right Have I
When I’ve Sung My Last Hillbilly
When The Roll Is Called Up Yonder
When We Live Again
Where Do You Stand
Where Dreams Come to Die (co-written with Buddy Cannon)
Where My House Lives
Where's The Show
White Cadillac Convertible Blue
Who Do I Know In Dallas (co-written With Hank Cochran)
Who'll Buy My Memories (co-written With Eddie Noack)
Why Are You Picking On Me
Why Do I Have To Choose
Wilie Tuning
Will You Remember
Will You Remember Mine
Within Your Crowd
Wives and Girlfriends
Wonderful Future
Words Don't Fit The Picture
Write Your Own Song

Y 
Yesterday's Wine
You Don't Think I'm Funny Anymore
You Dream About Me
You Left A Long Long Time Ago
You Memory Won't Die
You Ought To Hear Me Cry
You Took My Happiness Away
You'll Always Have Someone (co-written With Hank Cochran)
Your Country Boy
You Wouldn't Cross The Street

References

Lists of songs by songwriters